Nathan Waters (born 14 September 1984) is an Australian former professional rugby league footballer who played in the 2010s for the Wests Tigers of the National Rugby League.

Playing career
Born in Sydney, Waters played his junior football for Eagle Vale before being signed by the Western Suburbs Magpies. He played for the Magpies in the Premier League in 2006 before being signed by the Magpies' affiliate NRL club, Wests Tigers.

In Round 8 of the 2010 NRL season he made his NRL debut for the Tigers against the Sydney Roosters.

Although the Wests Tigers had 2 feeder sides, in 2012 all fringe first-graders were chosen to play in the Balmain Ryde-Eastwood team. Waters was a member of this team when they contested the 2012 NSW Cup Grand Final, narrowly losing.

Representative career
In 2010, Waters played for the NSW Residents team against the QLD Residents.

References

External links
2012 Balmain Ryde-Eastwood Tigers profile

1984 births
Wests Tigers players
Balmain Ryde-Eastwood Tigers players
Western Suburbs Magpies NSW Cup players
Wests Tigers NSW Cup players
Rugby league halfbacks
Rugby league hookers
Australian rugby league players
Living people
Rugby league players from Sydney